The Corporate and Project Management Research Institute (Autonomous Non-Commercial Organization) (CPMI) is a non-commercial organization working on problems of improving the efficiency of corporate and project management. The main goal of the institute is the consolidation of worldwide PM experience, integrating it with international practices and adapting to the modern requirements of the market and the legislation.

History 
The Corporate and Project Management Research Institute was established with the aim of improving project management efficiency.

The main goal of the Institute is the formation of a modern school and practices of corporate and project management through the consolidation of worldwide PM experience, its integration with the best international practices and their adaptation to the modern requirements and realities.

In the Institute's work, instruments and methodologies of improving project management efficiency are used, including monitoring systems for large-scale projects and the efficiency assessment of their management mechanisms, a system of assessing planned figures and actual data of auditable milestones, a system of risk management and problem situations management.

We are confident that the knowledge and experience of CPMI experts will help improve the efficiency in large-scale projects and programs management systems, allowing not only to correctly plan the budgets, but to also employ well-timed measures in minimizing risks, as well as to make allowances to achieve initial objectives.

Work 
The Corporate and Project Management Research Institute (CPMI) was established with the aim of improving the efficiency of corporate and project management.

The main goal of the institute is the creation of modern school and practices of corporate and project management by way of consolidation of worldwide PM experience, integrating it with the best international practices and adapting to modern requirements and realities.

The mission is the creation of a modern school of corporate and project management.

The aims:
 The widest possible major distribution of accumulated knowledge and experience in project management;
 An education in the culture of corporate and project management at all levels of state and business management;
 An improvement in the efficiency of realization of large-scale programs and projects.

The CPMI team includes experts with ten to forty years of professional experience.

Expert Councils 
The main objective of the Boards of Experts is to identify relevant problems and prepare solutions for their liquidation, or for the minimization of risks. Moreover, the CPMI Boards of Experts will participate in the development of methodological documents, spelling out project, corporate management and solutions in topical areas. 
The Boards of Experts include not only CPMI employees, but also acknowledged specialists in the professional knowledge relating to the topical areas.

– Expert Council on project management
– Expert Council on communications systems
– Expert Council on price formation in the construction
– Expert Council on project management and investments
– Expert Council on payment systems

Experts for Project Management and Investments 
Nowadays it is very important to develop the competence and to improve the legislation in the course of investment projects implementation.

Today, however, we see the following issues in investment projects realization:

 underdeveloped legislative framework for cooperation in the field of investment projects;
 lack of mechanisms to stimulate growth in the number of investment projects;
 absence of competence in managing the implementation of the investment projects;
 absence of regulatory framework for investment project management, including in the field of:
 project planning;
 approaches unity during the drafting;
 management tools to implement the projects;
 risk management for the projects;
 lack of quality assurance at all stages and phases of the project implementations.

What prevents to improve the implementation of investment projects today?

The stage of initiation (search activity for investment) takes the main place in the implementation of investment projects. But usually the main problems in the project arise at the stage of implementation and maintenance. That is why the issue of management and organization of the investment projects is so important. The result will depend directly upon the involvement and decision-making by all of the project parties.

In order to study the problems of the investment projects and to develop the methodological recommendations and solutions a special skilled teamof experts was gathered the CPMI. Currently, the targetsare as follows :

 create a regulatory framework for the investment project management and its application in practice;
 develop of competence in the investment project management;
 form the tools to stimulate the social responsibility in the course of the investment projects implementations.

The CPMI provides commercial support for organizations involved in the investment projects. Our specialists will help to solve the problem of the investment project management, including:

 development of the methodology for the investment project management;
 building the system of the investment project management;
 development the tools for the investment project management;
 creation the guidelines for managing of the investment projects;
 development the methodological recommendations to transfer the experience in managing of the current projects and others.

The Experts Library 
One of the main tasks of the CPMI is the widest possible dissemination of knowledge and national experience in the project management.
In order to perform this task the electronic Expert Library has been founded at the institute; the documents related to corporate and project management are being collected there:
 methodological solutions in the project management;
 historical materials;
 the experts’ views in different subject areas;
 the institute employees’ publications and works, and other things.

Publications and scientific works
 "Organization of the work of the board of directors"
 "Risk Management, Audit and Internal Control"
 "Preparation of an investment project"
 "Project Management Mechanics"
 "Project Office"
 "Enterprise Knowledge Management"

Links 
 Official company website

See also 
 CPMI (disambiguation)

Project management professional associations